The 2021 Pan American Judo Championships was a judo event which took place in Guadalajara, Mexico, from 15 to 16 April 2021.

Medal table

Results

Men's events

Women's events

References

External links
 
 Results

2021
American Championships
International sports competitions hosted by Mexico
Pan American Judo Championships
Pan American Judo Championships